The cheeks constitute the area of the face below the eyes and between the nose and the left or right ear. "Buccal" means relating to the cheek. In humans, the region is innervated by the buccal nerve. The area between the inside of the cheek and the teeth and gums is called the vestibule or buccal pouch or buccal cavity and forms part of the mouth. In other animals the cheeks may also be referred to as jowls.

Structure

Humans
Cheeks are fleshy in humans, the skin being suspended by the chin and the jaws, and forming the lateral wall of the human mouth, visibly touching the cheekbone below the eye. The inside of the cheek is lined with a mucous membrane (buccal mucosa, part of the oral mucosa).

During mastication (chewing), the cheeks and tongue between them serve to keep the food between the teeth.

Other animals
The cheeks are covered externally by hairy skin, and internally by stratified squamous epithelium. This is mostly smooth, but may have caudally directed papillae (e.g., in ruminants). The mucosa is supplied with secretions from the Buccal glands, which are arranged in superior and inferior groups. In carnivores, the superior buccal gland is large and discrete: the Zygomatic gland. During mastication (chewing), the cheeks and tongue between them serve to keep the food between the teeth.

Some animals such as squirrels and hamsters use the buccal pouch to carry food or other items.

 
In some vertebrates, markings on the cheek area, particularly immediately beneath the eye, often serve as important distinguishing features between species or individuals.

Buttocks 
Sometimes people refer to the buttocks as the "cheeks", because of their semi-round appearance.

Society and culture
The cheek is the most common location from which a DNA sample can be taken. (Some saliva is collected from inside the mouth, e.g. using a cotton-tipped rod called a swab or "Q-Tip". The procedure of collecting a sample in that way can be called a "cheek swab").

See also 

 High cheekbones
 Blushing
 Cheek augmentation
 Erythema infectiosum
 Tongue-in-cheek
 Zygomatic bone
 Cheek kissing
 Slap cheek

References

External links
 

Human head and neck
Facial features